Anthony or Tony Allan may refer to:

Anthony Havelock-Allan (1904–2003), British film producer and screenwriter
John Hubbard (actor) (1914–1988), known as Anthony Allan
John Anthony Allan (1937–2021), known as Tony Allan, geographer at King's College London
Tony Allan (1949–2004), British DJ and voiceover artist
Tony Allan (jockey), New Zealand jockey

See also
Anthony Allen (disambiguation)
Tony Allen (disambiguation)